Liddaton Halt was a railway station opened in 1938 by the Great Western Railway to serve the hamlet of Liddaton that lies between Coryton and Lydford in West Devon, England.

The halt was opened at a later date than most of the stations on the line from Plymouth to Launceston which had itself opened in 1865. The single platform's original construction was an open wooden structure with a small wood built shelter, one oil lamp and a single platform name board. An overbridge lay at the Coryton end of the platform. The track was single with no passing loop or sidings.

See also
South Devon and Tavistock Railway

References
Notes

Sources
 Butt, R. V. J. (1995). The Directory of Railway Stations: details every public and private passenger station, halt, platform and stopping place, past and present (1st ed.). Sparkford: Patrick Stephens Ltd. . OCLC 60251199.

Railway stations in Great Britain opened in 1938
Disused railway stations in Devon
Former Great Western Railway stations
Railway stations in Great Britain closed in 1962